Birger Brosa  Old Norse: Birgir Brósa  (died 9 January 1202) was jarl of Sweden from 1174 to 1202.

Biography
He was a son of Bengt Snivil and a member of the powerful House of Bjälbo. In the medieval texts he is either called the jarl of the Swedes or the jarl of the Swedes and the Geats. Birger was appointed to the position of jarl during the reign of Knut Eriksson. He maintained the position during Knut's successor Sverker II until his death in 1202.

Before 1170, Birger was married to Brigida Haraldsdotter, the daughter of Norwegian King Harald Gille. She had formerly been married to the Danish pretender Magnus Henriksson, who had briefly ruled in Uppsala 1160–1161.

Birger appears to have maintained peace in Sweden during the civil wars that ravaged Denmark and Norway. Many of the pretenders in these kingdoms sought refuge with Birger. Among them were the Birkebeiner chieftains Eystein Meyla and Sverre Sigurdsson who were kinsmen of Brigida Haraldsdotter. Birger's son Philippus was in the service of King Sverre and died as his jarl in 1200. Birger owned estates in Östergötland, Närke, Värmland and Södermanland. He was a great donor to Riseberga Abbey in Närke, where his widow Brigida  spent her last years after Birger's death.  As soon as he was dead, a civil war broke out.

Children 
 Philippus Birgersson (d. 1200), Jarl of Norway in the service of King Sverre of Norway and one of his most staunch supporters.
 Knut Birgersson, Riksjarl of Sweden, jarl of Sweden. According to one source, Knut was married to king Knut Eriksson's daughter, named Sigrid in that source. He was killed in 1208 at the Battle of Lena (1208) or the Battle of Gestilren (1210).
 Folke Birgersson, jarl of Sweden, killed 1210 at the Battle of Gestilren
Magnus Birgersson, Snorre names (in order) "Earl Philip, Earl Knut, Folke and Magnus" as the four sons of "Earl Birger Brose" & his wife.
Ingegerd Birgersdotter, married to King Sverker II and became the mother of King John I of Sweden.
Kristina Birgersdotter
Margareta Birgersdotter

Portrayal in popular culture 
Birger Brosa was portrayed by Stellan Skarsgård in the Swedish 2007 film Arn – The Knight Templar and 2008 sequel Arn – The Kingdom at Road's End.

References 

12th-century births
1202 deaths
Year of birth unknown

Swedish politicians
13th-century Swedish people
House of Bjelbo
Swedish jarls